Stefano Gandin (born 29 March 1996) is an Italian racing cyclist, who currently rides for UCI ProTeam .

Major results
2019
 2nd V4 Special Series Debrecen–Ibrany
 5th Overall Tour de Serbie
 9th Visegrad 4 Kerekparverseny
 10th Overall Tour du Maroc
1st Stage 4
2020
 1st 
2021
 7th Per sempre Alfredo
 9th GP Adria Mobil
2022
 1st  Mountains classification, Giro di Sicilia
 1st Stage 3b Sibiu Cycling Tour
 1st Stages 1 & 8 Vuelta a Venezuela
 9th Grand Prix Alanya

References

External links

1996 births
Living people
Italian male cyclists
People from Vittorio Veneto
Cyclists from Veneto